Emile Weil (January 20, 1878 – January 19, 1945) was a noted architect of New Orleans, Louisiana.

He studied with New Orleans artist William Woodward.

A number of his works are listed on the U.S. National Register of Historic Places.

Works include:
Arabian Theatre, Laurel, Mississippi (built 1927)
B. Lowenstein & Brothers Building, 27 S. Main St. Memphis, TN, NRHP-listed
Benjamin-Moore-Christovitch Residence, 5531 St. Charles Ave., New Orleans, LA
Bohn Motor Company Building, South Broad St., New Orleans, LA (built 1926)
Church of St. John the Evangelist, Plaquemine, LA
Canal Bank & Trust Company (New Orleans, LA)
Crane Co. Building (New Orleans, Louisiana) (built 1922), 1148 S. Peters St. New Orleans, LA, Mill Construction style
Dixie Brewery (New Orleans, LA)
Four Winds (New Orleans, LA)
Jerusalem Temple of the Shriners of New Orleans (with Stone Bros., architects, now Church of the King), 1137 St. Charles Ave., New Orleans, LA (built 1916)
Jefferson Theatre (built 1927), 345 Fannin St. Beaumont, Texas, NRHP-listed
Leon Fellman Building, 810 Canal St., New Orleans, LA
Newberger House, 1640 Palmer Ave. New Orleans, LA, NRHP-listed
Pelican Stadium
Saenger Theatre (Hattiesburg, Mississippi) (built 1929), Art Deco style, NRHP-listed
Saenger Theatre (Mobile, Alabama) (built 1927)
Saenger Theatre (New Orleans, Louisiana) (built 1927), 1111 Canal St. New Orleans, LA, Atmospheric theatre style, NRHP-listed
Saenger Theatre (Pensacola, Florida) (built 1925), 118 S. Palafox St. Pensacola, FL, NRHP-listed
Saenger Theatre (Pine Bluff, Arkansas) (built 1924), NRHP-listed
Saenger Theatre (Texarkana, Texas) (built 1924), renamed the Perot Theatre, 221 Main St, Texarkana, Texas, NRHP-listed
Salomon Residence, 5428 St. Charles Ave., New Orleans, LA 
S. H. Kress Department Store (New Orleans, Louisiana)
Strand Theatre (Shreveport, Louisiana), (built 1925), 630 Crockett Shreveport, LA, NRHP-listed
Temple Theater (Meridian, Mississippi) construction started 1923, 2318 8th St. Meridian, MS, Moorish Revival architecture style, NRHP-listed
Tivoli Theatre (New Orleans, Louisiana)
Touro Synagogue (New Orleans, Louisiana) New Orleans, LA (built 1909)
Union Bethel A.M.E. Church (New Orleans, Louisiana), 2321 Thalia New Orleans, LA, NRHP-listed
Whitney National Bank, St. Charles Ave., New Orleans, LA

References

American architects
1878 births
1945 deaths
Architects from New Orleans